Laku Kach (also Romanized as Lakū Kach; also known as Lakū Kaj) is a village in Sand-e Mir Suiyan Rural District, Dashtiari District, Chabahar County, Sistan and Baluchestan Province, Iran. At the 2006 census, its population was 229, in 46 families.

References 

Populated places in Chabahar County